The 2019 AFC U-16 Women's Championship was the 8th edition of the AFC U-16 Women's Championship, the biennial international youth football championship organised by the Asian Football Confederation (AFC) for the women's under-16 national teams of Asia. The tournament was held in Thailand between 15 and 28 September 2019, with a total of eight teams competing.

The top two teams of the tournament would have qualified for the 2021 FIFA U-17 Women's World Cup (originally 2020 but postponed due to COVID-19 pandemic) in India as the AFC representatives, besides India who would have automatically qualified as hosts. However, FIFA announced on 17 November 2020 that this edition of the World Cup would be cancelled.

This edition was the last to be played as an under-16 tournament, as the AFC have agreed to the proposal for switching the tournament from under-16 to under-17 starting from 2022.

North Korea were the defending champions, but were defeated 2–1 in the final by Japan.

Qualification

Four teams qualified directly for the final tournament: the hosts and the top three of 2017. The other four spots were determined by the qualifying stage.

A total of 30 teams entered the qualifying stage. Due to the increased number of teams, two qualification rounds were scheduled for the first time. The first round was scheduled for 15–23 September 2018, and the second round was scheduled for 23 February – 3 March 2019.

Qualified teams
The following teams have qualified for the tournament.

Venues
The matches are played at two venues, both at the Mueang Chonburi District in Chonburi Province.
Chonburi Stadium
IPE Chonburi Stadium

Draw
The draw was held on 23 May 2019, 15:30 ICT (UTC+7), at the Oakwood Hotel in Chonburi, Thailand. The eight teams were drawn into two groups of four teams. The teams were seeded according to their performance in the 2017 AFC U-16 Women's Championship final tournament and qualification, with the hosts Thailand automatically seeded and assigned to Position A1 in the draw.

Squads

Players born between 1 January 2003 and 31 December 2005 are eligible to compete in the tournament. Each team must register a squad of minimum 16 players and maximum 23 players, minimum two of whom must be goalkeepers (Regulations Articles 24.1 and 24.2).

Group stage
The top two teams of each group advance to the semi-finals.

Tiebreakers
Teams are ranked according to points (3 points for a win, 1 point for a draw, 0 points for a loss), and if tied on points, the following tiebreaking criteria are applied, in the order given, to determine the rankings (Regulations Article 9.3):
Points in head-to-head matches among tied teams;
Goal difference in head-to-head matches among tied teams;
Goals scored in head-to-head matches among tied teams;
If more than two teams are tied, and after applying all head-to-head criteria above, a subset of teams are still tied, all head-to-head criteria above are reapplied exclusively to this subset of teams;
Goal difference in all group matches;
Goals scored in all group matches;
Penalty shoot-out if only two teams are tied and they met in the last round of the group;
Disciplinary points (yellow card = 1 point, red card as a result of two yellow cards = 3 points, direct red card = 3 points, yellow card followed by direct red card = 4 points);
Drawing of lots.

All times are local, ICT (UTC+7).

Group A

Group B

Knockout stage
In the knockout stage, penalty shoot-out (no extra time) was used to decide the winner if necessary (Regulations Articles 12.1 and 12.2).

Bracket

Semi-finals
Winners qualified for 2021 FIFA U-17 Women's World Cup.

Third place match

Final

Winners

Awards
The following awards were given at the conclusion of the tournament:

Qualified teams for FIFA U-17 Women's World Cup
The following three teams from AFC would have qualified for the 2021 FIFA U-17 Women's World Cup before the tournament was cancelled.

All three teams qualified for the 2022 FIFA U-17 Women's World Cup, including India who qualified automatically as host. On 16 March 2022, the AFC announced that China PR would replace North Korea as the AFC’s representatives at the FIFA U-17 Women's World Cup. On 16 August 2022, it was announced that the All India Football Federation, or AIFF, was suspended by FIFA due to undue influence from third parties. As a result, the 2022 FIFA U-17 Women's World Cup was stripped from India, as FIFA planned to assess the next steps when it came to hosting the tournament. On 27 August, FIFA lifted the suspension, thus giving back the hosting rights to India.

1 Bold indicates champions for that year. Italic indicates hosts for that year.

Goalscorers

References

External links
, the-AFC.com
AFC U-16 Women's Championship 2019, stats.the-AFC.com

 
2019
U-16 Women's Championship
2019 in women's association football
2019 in youth association football
2019 in Thai football
2020 FIFA U-17 Women's World Cup qualification
2019 AFC U-16 Women's Championship
September 2019 sports events in Thailand